John Burroughs Hopkins (July 25, 1742 – December 5, 1796) was a captain of the Continental Navy during the American Revolutionary War.

Biography 

Hopkins was born in Newport, Rhode Island, the son of Continental navy commander-in-chief Esek Hopkins. John Hopkins was one of seven commanders involved in the Gaspée Affair, in which a British ship was destroyed. This was one of the leading causes of the Revolutionary War. John B. Hopkins was made one of five captains under his father according to in, December 1775, the United States Congress Marine Committee's meeting to discuss ranking the officers. He served in distinction during the war, the Providence Gazette, on March 12, 1796, called him an "eminent nautical commander".

References

External links
  – cenotaph
 Gaspee Info

1742 births
1796 deaths
Continental Navy officers
People from Newport, Rhode Island
Burials at North Burying Ground (Providence)
People of colonial Rhode Island
People of Rhode Island in the American Revolution